Improvement District No. 13, or Improvement District No. 13 (Elk Island), is an improvement district in Alberta, Canada. Coextensive with Elk Island National Park in central Alberta, the improvement district provides local governance for lands within the park.

History 
Improvement District (ID) No. 13 was originally formed as ID No. 97 on April 1, 1958. ID No. 97 was renumbered to ID No. 13 on January 1, 1969.

Geography

Communities and localities 
There are no urban municipalities, hamlets, or urban service areas within Improvement District No. 13.

The following localities are within Improvement District No. 13.
Localities
Elk Island National Park
Sandy Beach

Demographics 
In the 2021 Census of Population conducted by Statistics Canada, Improvement District No. 13 had a population of 0 living in 0 of its 0 total private dwellings, no change from its 2016 population of 0.

Government 
Improvement District No. 13 is governed by Alberta's Minister of Municipal Affairs.

See also 
List of communities in Alberta

References 

1958 establishments in Alberta

13